Chapman's bristle tyrant (Pogonotriccus chapmani), also known as Chapman's tyrannulet, is a species of passerine bird in the family Tyrannidae. This species is sometimes placed in the genus Phylloscartes.

It is found in the tepuis of southern Venezuela. Its natural habitat is subtropical or tropical moist montane forests.

References

Chapman's bristle tyrant
Birds of the Tepuis
Chapman's bristle tyrant
Taxonomy articles created by Polbot